The 2016–17 season was Cagliari Calcio's first season back in Serie A after being relegated at the end of the 2014–15 season. The club competed in Serie A, finishing 11th, and in the Coppa Italia, being eliminated in the fourth round.

Players

Squad information

Transfers

In

Out

Pre-season and friendlies

Competitions

Overall

Last updated: 28 May 2017

Serie A

League table

Results summary

Results by round

Matches

Coppa Italia

Statistics

Appearances and goals

|-
! colspan=14 style="background:#000080; color:#FF0000; text-align:center| Goalkeepers

|-
! colspan=14 style="background:#000080; color:#FF0000; text-align:center| Defenders

|-
! colspan=14 style="background:#000080; color:#FF0000; text-align:center| Midfielders

|-
! colspan=14 style="background:#000080; color:#FF0000; text-align:center| Forwards

|-
! colspan=14 style="background:#000080; color:#FF0000; text-align:center| Players transferred out during the season

Goalscorers

Last updated: 28 May 2017

Clean sheets

Last updated: 28 May 2017

Disciplinary record

Last updated: 28 May 2017

References

Cagliari Calcio seasons
Cagliari